The Central Geological Survey (CGS) is the government agency of the Ministry of Economic Affairs of the Taiwan (ROC) responsible for geological surveys and geoscience research.

History
The CGS was founded on 20 November 1978 replacing the former Provincial Geological Survey of Taiwan.

Organizational structures
 Planning Office
 Regional Geology Division
 Active Tectonics Division
 Environmental and Engineering Geology Division
 Geological Resource Division
 Geological Information Division
 Secretarial Office
 Personnel Office
 Accounting Office
 Discipline Office

Transportation
The CGS headquarter office is accessible within walking distance south of Nanshijiao Station of Taipei Metro.

See also
 Ministry of Economic Affairs (Taiwan)
 Geology of Taiwan

References

External links
 

1978 establishments in Taiwan
Executive Yuan
Government agencies established in 1978
Organizations based in New Taipei